The 2006 William & Mary Tribe football team represented the College of William & Mary as member of South Division of the Atlantic 10 Conference (A-10) during the 2006 NCAA Division I FCS football season. Led by Jimmye Laycock in his 27th year as head coach, William & Mary finished the season with an overall record of 3–8 and a mark of 1–7 in A-10 play, placing last out of six teams in the South Division.

Schedule

References

William and Mary
William & Mary Tribe football seasons
William and Mary Indians football